Bohman & Schwartz was a coach building business in Pasadena, California. It was established after the collapse of the Walter M Murphy Company by some of Murphy's former employees.

References

External links

http://www.coachbuilt.com/bui/b/bohman_schwartz/bohman_schwartz.htm

Coachbuilders of the United States
Defunct motor vehicle manufacturers of the United States
Luxury motor vehicle manufacturers
American companies established in 1932
Manufacturing companies established in 1932
Manufacturing companies based in Los Angeles
1932 establishments in California